Open Enterprise Server (OES) is a server operating system published by Novell in March 2005 to succeed their NetWare product.

Unlike NetWare, Novell OES is a Linux distribution—specifically, one based on SUSE Linux Enterprise Server. The first major release of Open Enterprise Server (OES 1) could run either with a Linux kernel (with a NetWare compatibility layer) or Novell's NetWare kernel (with a Linux compatibility layer). Novell discontinued the NetWare kernel prior to the release of OES 2, but NetWare 6.5 SP7, and later SP8 can run as a paravirtualized guest inside the Xen hypervisor (Officially supported until 7 March 2012, Novell self-supported until 7 March 2015).

OES 1 and OES 2 
Novell released OES 1, the first version of OES, on 25 March 2005. Since some users wanted backward compatibility with NetWare, Novell offered two installation options: OES-NetWare and OES-Linux. These are two different operating systems with different kernels and different userlands.

OES-NetWare is NetWare v6.5 equipped with NetWare Loadable Modules for various Novell services (such as NetWare Core Protocol, Novell eDirectory, Novell Storage Services, and iPrint) and open-source software (such as OpenSSH, Apache Tomcat, and the Apache HTTP Server).

OES-Linux is based on the SUSE Linux Enterprise Server (SLES) with added NetWare services ported to the Linux kernel: e.g. the NetWare Core Protocol, Novell eDirectory, Novell Storage Services, and iPrint.

Novell released OES 2, the second version of OES, on 12 October 2007. It was the first SLES-Linux-kernel-only OES, but it retained the OES-NetWare operating system option, as NetWare 6.5 SP7 can run as a paravirtualized guest inside the Xen hypervisor. The SLES base of the OES 2 was later updated to SLES 10 SP1.

Features introduced in OES 2 include:
 32-bit system or 64-bit system supporting 64 bit and 32 bit applications
 Hardware virtualization
 Dynamic Storage Technology, which provides Novell Shadow Volumes
 Windows domain services (from OES 2 SP1)
 Apple Filing Protocol (AFP) with Cross Protocoll Locking AFP-NCP-Samba (CPL) (from OES 2 SP1)

See also (based on different OES editions):
 Novell Open Workgroup Suite
 Novell Open Workgroup Suite Small Business Edition

OES 11 
OES 11 was released on 12 December 2011 based on SLES 11 SP1 64-bit (From OES 2 no NetWare kernel any more). This is the first version of OES to be 64-bit (x86_64) only. NetWare 6.5 SP8 was still possible to run as a 32-bit only paravirtualized guest inside the Xen hypervisor.
  
 Introduces Novell Kanaka for Mac client
 Uses Zypper tool to patch up to 100 times faster than OES2
 Added Automated / Unattended Upgrades from OES2 
 New Novell Linux Volume Manager ( NLVM) provides easier storage management

Novell released a service pack, OES 11 SP1, on 28 August 2012.

Novell released a service pack, OES 11 SP2, on 28 January 2014.

Novell released a service pack, OES 11 SP3, on 26 July 2016.

OES 2015
 OES 2015 was released on 31 August 2015, added new features and improved performance.
 OES 2015 SP1 was released on 14 June 2016.

OES 2018
 OES 2018 was released on 28 November 2017, based on SLES 12 SP2.
 OES 2018 SP1 was released on 7 February 2019, based on SLES 12 SP3.
 OES 2018 SP2 was released on 5 May 2020, based on SLES 12 SP5.
 OES 2018 SP3 was released on 15 Jul 2021, based on SLES 12 SP5.

Release summary 
 OES, released on 25 March 2005, based on NetWare 6.5 SP3 and SLES 9 SP1.
 OES SP1, released in September 2005, was based on NetWare 6.5 SP4 and SLES 9 SP2.
 OES SP2, released in January 2006, was based on NetWare 6.5 SP5 and SLES 9 SP3.
 OES 2, released on 12 October 2007 based on NetWare 6.5 SP7 and SLES 10 SP1.
 OES 2 SP1, released on 1 December 2008, based on NetWare 6.5 SP8 and SLES 10 SP2.
 OES 2 SP2 was released on 11 November 2009, based on SLES 10 SP3.
 OES 2 SP3 was released on 7 November 2014, based on SLES 10 SP3, SLES 10 SP4 (as of April 15, 2011).
 OES 11 was released on 12 December 2011, based on SLES 11 SP1 (64-bit only).
 OES 11 SP1 was released on 28 August 2012, based on SLES 11 SP2.
 OES 11 SP2 was released on 28 January 2014, based on SLES 11 SP3.
 OES 11 SP3 was released on 26 July 2016, based on SLES 11 SP4.
 OES 2015 was released on 31 August 2015., based on SLES 11 SP3.
 OES 2015 SP1 was released on 14 June 2016, SLES 11 SP4.
 OES 2018 was released on 28 November 2017, based on SLES 12 SP2.
 OES 2018 SP1 was released on 7 February 2019, based on SLES 12 SP3.
 OES 2018 SP2 was released on 5 May 2020, based on SLES 12 SP5.
 OES 2018 SP3 was released on 15 Jul 2021, based on SLES 12 SP5.
 OES 2023 was released on 13 October 2022, based on SLES 15 SP4.

End-of-support schedule

Components 

 Automatic Client Upgrade (ACU)  automates the upgrade of Novell client software on existing workstations

See also
 SUSE Linux
 SUSE Linux Enterprise Server

References

Further reading

External links 
 Open Enterprise Server product page

2005 software
NetWare
Novell operating systems
Proprietary software
X86-64 Linux distributions
Linux distributions